Claire in Motion is a 2016 American drama film written and directed by Annie J. Howell and Lisa Robinson. The film stars Betsy Brandt, Chris Beetem, Zev Haworth, Anna Margaret Hollyman and Sakina Jaffrey. The film was released on January 13, 2017, by Breaking Glass Pictures.

Cast  
Betsy Brandt as Claire
Chris Beetem as Paul
Zev Haworth as Connor
Anna Margaret Hollyman as Allison
Sakina Jaffrey as Maya

Release
The film premiered at South by Southwest on March 15, 2016. The film was released on January 13, 2017, by Breaking Glass Pictures.

References

External links
 

2016 films
2016 drama films
American drama films
2010s English-language films
2010s American films